Russia–Tajikistan relations are the bilateral relations between the Russian Federation and Tajikistan.

Both countries are close allies and members of the Shanghai Cooperation Organisation, the military alliance formed by the Collective Security Treaty Organization, and the Commonwealth of Independent States. Tajikistan hosts Russian military units and infrastructure in Central Asia. Tajikistan and Russia also work closely together in issues concerning Afghanistan and are partners in anti-terrorism, anti-narcotics, and intelligence operations.

On May 25, 1993, a Treaty of Friendship, Cooperation and Mutual Assistance was signed between the two countries.

Tajikistan is highly dependent on the remittances coming from Russia. In 2012, it received US$3.595 billion in migrant remittances, equalling some 48% of its GDP. Some 1.5 million Tajiks work abroad, mostly in Russia.

The current Ambassador of Russia to Tajikistan is Igor Lyakin-Frolov. The current Ambassador of Tajikistan to Russia is Imomuddin Sattorov.

See also
Foreign relations of Russia
Foreign relations of Tajikistan

External links
  Documents on the Russia–Tajikistan relationship at the Russian Ministry of Foreign Affairs

 Russian Center of Science and Culture in Dushanbe

Diplomatic missions
  Embassy of Russia in Dushanbe
  Embassy of Tajikistan in Moscow
  Consulate-General of Russia in Khuzhand
  Consulate-General of Tajikistan in Ekaterinburg

References

 
Tajikistan
Bilateral relations of Tajikistan